Amy Diane Walen (née Teufel, born December 26, 1967) is an American politician who is the member of the Washington House of Representatives from the 48th district in King County.

Political career

Election
Walen was elected in the general election on November 6, 2018, winning 73 percent of the vote over 27 percent of another Democratic candidate, Cindi Bright.

References

1967 births
Living people
Democratic Party members of the Washington House of Representatives
21st-century American politicians
21st-century American women politicians
Women state legislators in Washington (state)